Slide Mountain is a  summit located in British Columbia, Canada.

Description

Precipitation runoff from the peak drains west to Powell Lake and east to the Eldred River, thence Powell Lake. Topographic relief is significant as the summit rises 2,000 meters (6,560 feet) above the lake in four kilometers (2.5 miles). The first ascent of the summit was made in 1942 by Ian Kay.

Climate

Based on the Köppen climate classification, Slide Mountain is located in a marine west coast climate zone of western North America. Most weather fronts originate in the Pacific Ocean, and travel east toward the Coast Mountains where they are forced upward by the range (Orographic lift), causing them to drop their moisture in the form of rain or snowfall. As a result, the Coast Mountains experience high precipitation, especially during the winter months in the form of snowfall. Winter temperatures can drop below −20 °C with wind chill factors  below −30 °C.

See also
 
 Geography of British Columbia

References

Pacific Ranges
Two-thousanders of British Columbia
New Westminster Land District
Coast Mountains